The MSL Aero H80 is a French ultralight aircraft that was designed by Massimo Tedesco and Sebastian Lefebre and produced by MSL Aero of Limoges-Fourches.

The company seem to have gone out of business in early 2015 and production ended.

Design and development
The aircraft was designed to comply with the Fédération Aéronautique Internationale microlight rules. It features a strut-braced high-wing, a two-seats-in-side-by-side configuration enclosed cockpit, fixed tricycle landing gear and a single engine in tractor configuration.

The aircraft is made from sheet aluminum. The wing is supported by V-struts and jury struts. Standard engines available are the  Rotax 912UL and the  Rotax 912ULS four-stroke powerplants.

Variants
H80
Version with the  Rotax 912UL engine.
H100
Version with the  Rotax 912ULS engine.
H2O
Floatplane version.
Type H
Version for the European ELA-1 category.

Specifications (H80)

References

External links

2000s French ultralight aircraft
Homebuilt aircraft
Single-engined tractor aircraft